Markaz, or the equivalent term in Persian, is a second-level administrative division found in the Middle East. Examples include:

 Markazes of Egypt, below Governorates of Egypt
 Markaz in Saudi Arabia, below Governorates of Saudi Arabia
 The capital city of a province of Iran
 A merkez is a district of Turkey (ilçe) that serves as the capital of a province.

The word markaz, as a term, in Arabic means "center."

Types of administrative division